Richard Dean Vanderhook (born May 13, 1961) is a former American baseball coach and infielder. He played college baseball at Cerritos College for head coach George Horton from 1982 to 1983 prior to transferring to Cal State Fullerton where he played for head coach Augie Garrido from 1983 to 1984. Vanderhook helped Cal State Fullerton's 1984 national championship team.

Following his playing career, Vanderhook became an assistant coach at Cal State Fullerton from 1985–1988, Cal State Northridge Matadors from 1989–1990, Cal State Fullerton again from 1991–2007, and UCLA Bruins from 2009–2011.

He completed his bachelor's degree in physical education at Trinity University in 2003. Vanderhook retired from coaching on June 7, 2021.

Head coaching record

References

External links
Cal State Fullerton bio of Vanderhook

1961 births
Living people
Cal State Fullerton Titans baseball players
Cal State Fullerton Titans baseball coaches
Cal State Northridge Matadors baseball coaches
UCLA Bruins baseball coaches
People from Lakewood, California
Sportspeople from Los Angeles County, California
Trinity University (Texas) alumni
Baseball infielders
Cerritos Falcons baseball players